Atanasio Bello Montero (born in Caracas) was a nineteenth-century Venezuelan composer and music educator.

Montero trained under Pedro Palacios y Sojo and founded an academy for music in Caracas with Luís Jumel in 1821. With José María Izáza he founded a philharmonic society in the same city in 1831. From 1834 he directed a music education institution founded by the Sociedad Económica de Amigos del País, and he founded Bogota's first opera company in 1847.

As a composer he is best known for his 1842 Vigil and Mass of the Dead, which were performed upon the transfer of Simon Bolivar's ashes to Caracas.

References

People from Caracas
Venezuelan conductors (music)
Male conductors (music)
19th-century conductors (music)
19th-century male musicians